Attik (real name Kleon Triantafyllou (Κλέων Τριανταφύλλου); 19 March 1885 – 29 August 1944) was a significant Greek composer of the early 20th century.

Biography
Attik was born in Athens and grew up in Egypt, where he took music lessons. From 1907 until 1930, he lived in Paris.

In 1930, he went to Athens and created the famous Mandra of Attik, a group of artists, singers and performers, directed by himself.

In 1944, a few months before the end of the Axis occupation of Greece, he appeared in the film of Giorgos Tzavellas Hirokrotimata (1944). A little later he committed suicide by taking an overdose of his sedative medicine.

References

External links
  «O θείος μου, ο Αττίκ», αφήγηση της Πέλειας Τζαρτίλη, ανηψιάς του καλλιτέχνη, Περιοδικό «Κ»

1885 births
1944 deaths
1944 suicides
Greek songwriters
Greek pianists
Suicides in Greece
Drug-related suicides
People from Alexandria
20th-century pianists
20th-century Greek musicians
Greek expatriates in Egypt
Greek expatriates in France